This is a list of rivers that are part of the Mendoza Province of Argentina.  All rivers born on the area of the Andes range, except the Desaguadero River mainly located in the provinces of San Juan, San Luis and Mendoza in the Argentine region called Cuyo.

Rivers by alphabetical order
Atuel River
Barrancas River
Blanco River
Chico River
Cobre River
Colorado River
De las Vacas River
Desaguadero River (also known as Salado River in the southern zone)
Diamante River
Grande River
Horcones River
Las Cuevas River
Las Tunas River
Malargüe River
Mendoza River
Montañez River
Pabellón River
Picheuta River
Potimalal River
Relinchos River
San Carlos River
Tordillo River
Tunuyán River
Tupungato River
Uspallata River
Valenzuela River

See also
List of rivers of Argentina:)

External links
  General Irrigation Department 
M